Sebastián Ezequiel Anchoverri Ponce (born 26 April 1991) is an Argentine professional footballer who plays as a goalkeeper for Ferrocarril Midland.

Career
Anchoverri started in the youth system of Temperley, which preceded a ten-year youth spell with Lanús. He departed Lanús in 2013 to play for San Telmo in Primera B Metropolitana. His professional debut arrived on 29 April during an away defeat to Almagro, which was one of five appearances for Anchoverri in 2012–13 which ended with relegation. In Primera C Metropolitana, Anchoverri made a total of seventy-six appearances in two years which concluded with San Telmo winning the 2015 title. On 30 June 2016, Anchoverri joined Argentine Primera División side Olimpo. He terminated his contract with Olimpo in April 2018.

He was subsequently signed by Brown of Primera B Nacional on 30 June.

Career statistics
.

Honours
San Telmo
Primera C Metropolitana: 2015

References

External links

1991 births
Living people
People from Lomas de Zamora
Argentine footballers
Association football goalkeepers
Primera B Metropolitana players
Primera C Metropolitana players
Argentine Primera División players
San Telmo footballers
Olimpo footballers
Club Atlético Brown footballers
Deportivo Español footballers
Club Atlético San Miguel footballers
Club Ferrocarril Midland players
Sportspeople from Buenos Aires Province